Jesús Jonathan Vera (born 10 January 1989) is an Argentine footballer. His last club was Juventud Unida Universitario.

References
 
 

1989 births
Living people
Association football forwards
Argentine footballers
Argentine expatriate footballers
Godoy Cruz Antonio Tomba footballers
C.D. Huachipato footballers
Defensa y Justicia footballers
San Jorge de Tucumán footballers
Othellos Athienou F.C. players
Chilean Primera División players
Cypriot First Division players
Expatriate footballers in Chile
Expatriate footballers in Cyprus
Sportspeople from Mendoza Province